Thazhuvia Ramasubbaiyer (2 October 1908 – 21 July 1984), popularly referred to as TVR, was a philanthropist and founder of the popular Tamil daily newspaper Dinamalar.

Early life

Ramasubbaiyer was born to a brahmin family on 2 October 1908 at Thazhuvia Mahadevar Koil village in the then Nanjilnadu, Nagercoil, (present-day Kanyakumari District).

Founding of Dinamalar

Ramasubbaiyer started a Tamil periodical Dinamalar on 6 September 1951 at Trivandrum. He later spread his operations to Tamil Nadu.

Later years
TVR died on 21 July 1984.

TVR’s son, Shri R Lakshmipathy, later became the Chairman of the Press Trust of India, and another son, Late Shri R Krishnamurthy became the President of the Numismatic Society.

References

People from Kanyakumari district
1908 births
1984 deaths
Tamil businesspeople